The Antennopoda (or Arthropoda) are a proposed clade consisting of the Euarthropoda and the Onychophora, as sister of the Tardigrada, together forming the Panarthropoda. Stanleycaris appears to be a basal Euarthropod.

Antennopoda was defined by De Haro, where Tartigrada was not included in his tree. In a subsequent article of him, his use of Antennopoda was inconsistent with the current usage. Especially the position of the Tartigrada is disputed.

References

Panarthropoda
Protostome unranked clades